ST6 beta-galactoside alpha-2,6-sialyltransferase 2 is a protein that in humans is encoded by the ST6GAL2 gene.

Function

This locus encodes a sialyltransferase. The encoded type II transmembrane protein catalyzes the transfer of sialic acid from CMP to an oligosaccharide substrate. Polymorphisms at this locus may be associated with variations in risperidone response in schizophrenic patients. Alternatively spliced transcript variants have been described. [provided by RefSeq, Jan 2012].

References

Further reading